Leader is a town in southwestern Saskatchewan, Canada, located approximately  directly east of Calgary, Alberta and is near the border between Saskatchewan and Alberta. It has a population of 863 as of 2016.

History

Before settlement, the Leader area was a hunting ground of prehistoric humans. A Midland Folsom point was discovered that the University of Saskatchewan dated back 8,000 to 9,000 years before present.

Leader lies in the traditional territory of the Nekaneet First Nation, who were signatories to Treaty 4.

Homesteaders began arriving in large numbers in 1907; most were German immigrants from the country of Prussia or southern Russia. A Royal Canadian Mounted Police (RCMP) detachment opened in 1909, and ensured all the settlers had adequate supplies to last the winter. By 1911, the Canadian Pacific Railway purchased a quarter section of land as the prospective site for a settlement. The railway arrived in 1913 and the village of Prussia was incorporated in September of that year. Hans Quittenbaum, owner of the general store, was named the first Reeve (or Mayor) of Prussia.
 By 1917, anti-German sentiment surrounding the events of World War I prompted the community to change its name, as well as replacing its German street names with numbers. The new name was chosen after a contest won by two local girls, Bertha Keller and Muriel Legault. They were inspired by the arrival of the Regina Morning Leader newspaper on the passenger train. The village name was officially changed to Leader on September 27, 1917; soon after, it incorporated as a town on November 1.

W.T. Smith, a local rancher, had the distinction of building North America's largest barn. The Smith Barn was completed in 1914, having taken 100 men five months to complete its construction; the building measured . Smith died in 1918, and his massive barn was dismantled down to the concrete foundation in 1921. The concrete foundation remains there to this day.

Following World War II the town's population grew, reaching a peak of 1236 in 1966. Since then the town's population has decreased, following Saskatchewan's overall trend of rural flight.

In 1995, American aviator Steve Fossett landed near Leader after taking off from South Korea, becoming the first person to make a solo flight across the Pacific Ocean in a balloon.

In November 2006, the inhabitants of Leader posed nude for a calendar in act of protest against the deteriorating condition of Highway 32, the main link to the city of Swift Current; it attracted the attention of media outlets in Canada and the United States. In the 2008-2009 provincial budget, the Ministry of Highways committed to rebuild Highway 32 between the villages of Shackleton and Prelate. The project was completed in November 2010 at a cost of $44.4 million.

High winds and dry conditions sparked a wildfire on October 17, 2017 that forced the town's population to evacuate to the town of Kindersley. The fire was contained and residents returned the next day. No one was injured and no structures were damaged, however the local waste station & local farmers had experienced fire damage.

Demographics 

Geography and climate
Leader is located in Saskatchewan's mixed grassland ecoregion. The Great Sand Hills, a  region of arid plains and sand dunes, lies just southeast of Leader.

Like much of southwestern Saskatchewan, Leader experiences a semi-arid climate (Köppen climate classification BSk). Winters are long, cold and dry, while summers are short but very warm.

Economy

Including three rural municipalities, Leader, is the centre of a retail trading area. The economic base of the community centres around the grain and cattle industries. The major industries in Leader and surrounding area are agricultural services and manufacturing. Leader also has tourism trade from attractions such as the Leader Bird Watching Trail, Smith Barn site, and the Great Sand Hills.

Attractions

Leader is the largest community in close proximity to the Great Sand Hills, a vast area of grassland and sand dunes in southern Saskatchewan. The Great Sand Hills are home to an abundance of wildlife, including sharp-tailed grouse, pronghorn, white pelican, merlin, peregrine falcon, coyote, white-tailed deer, golden eagle, badger, weasel, burrowing owl, mourning dove, porcupine, sandhill crane and fox. It is the only known Saskatchewan habitat of the rare Ord's kangaroo rat. Several large sculptures of local wildlife are found at various locations around the town of Leader.

The Great Sand Hills Museum is in the nearby village of Sceptre. The museum features historical displays depicting pioneer life such as a boarding house, hospital, livery stable, school, church, and barn as well as vintage farm machinery.

The South Saskatchewan River valley, just north of Leader, is the largest tract of riparian woodlands between the Cypress Hills and the northern forests. The Leader Bird Watching Trail is suited for viewing many native bird species, including pileated woodpecker, golden eagle, lark sparrow, yellow-breasted chat, red-headed woodpecker, yellow-green swallow, great blue heron, prairie falcon, ferruginous hawk, long-billed curlew, short-eared owl, loggerhead shrike, and burrowing owl.  It is also home to the prairie rattlesnake and one of few known localities of rattlesnakes in Saskatchewan. Checkboard Hill, 6.4 km west of Leader on Highway 741, has a wide view of the river and surrounding landscape.

The Smith Barn Site is a provincial heritage site, located approximately ten kilometres northwest of Leader on private property. Its concrete foundation is the only part of the building that remains. A scale model of the barn is located at the Leader tourist information booth.

The Hutterites Colony in Estuary was established in 1958. The colony members have preserved the traditional Hutterite production methods, culture, language, and religion. Guided tours of the colony are available to visitors.

Parks and recreation
 River Ridge Golf Course – 18 hole golf course with club house and pro shop
 Leader Swimming Pool – seasonal outdoor heated pool, built in the 1960s and upgraded in the 1990s. Replaced in 2011.
 Leader Millennium Gardens – designed by a student of the University of Guelph School of Landscape Architecture, and built in 2000 in recognition of Leader's history and cultural heritage
 Leader Lions Park – green space with playground structure
 Leader Ball Park – baseball facility with four ball diamonds, grandstands, a concession, beer gardens, and serviced camp sites for visiting teams
 Leader Arena – indoor artificial ice surface for hockey and ice skating
 Leader Community Hall – community hall built in 1983; hosts social events such as weddings and dances
 Leader Friendship Centre – social gathering place for senior citizens

Sports
Local sports teams include the Leader Expos (baseball) and the Leader Flyers (hockey). Other sports organizations include the Leader Minor Ball Club, Leader Minor Hockey Club and the Leader Skating Club.

Government
Leader's local government consists of a town council, composed of an elected mayor and six councillors. The current mayor is Craig Tondevold.

In provincial politics, Leader is in the constituency of Cypress Hills.

Infrastructure

Transportation
Leader is located at the junction of highways 21 and 32.  The former Canadian Pacific Railway line also runs through the town; it is currently operated by the Great Sandhills Railway Leader has an airport with an asphalt runway.

Utilities

Electricity is provided by SaskPower and natural gas is provided by SaskEnergy. The town maintains its own water supply system, including a pump house and filtration plant. Telephone and internet service is provided by SaskTel.

Health care

 Leader and District Integrated Health Care Facility
 Leader Home Care Office
 Leader Pharmacy 
 Dirk Family Pharmacy

Public safety

 Cypress Health Region emergency medical services
 Leader & District Fire Department
 RCMP Leader Detachment

Education

 Leader Composite School – teaches students from kindergarten through grade 12
 Great Plains College – offers courses by satellite
 St. Angela's Academy (closed) – independent Catholic residential school for girls in the neighbouring community of Prelate. Closed on June 30, 2007 after 88 years of operation.

See also
 List of communities in Saskatchewan
 List of towns in Saskatchewan

References

External links

Towns in Saskatchewan
Happyland No. 231, Saskatchewan